Migration Letters is an international triannual (Jan.-May-Sep.) peer-reviewed academic journal of migration studies published by Transnational Press London since 2004. Topics covered range from internal migration to transnational mobility and from voluntary to forced migration. Migration Letters is indexed and abstracted by the International Bibliography of the Social Sciences. The current co-editors are Ibrahim Sirkeci, Jeffrey Cohen, Elli Heikkilä, and Carla De Tona. Notable contributors to the journal include Ron J. Johnston (Victoria Medal in Geography, 1990), Caroline Brettell, Gordon F. De Jong, Philip L. Martin and Thomas Faist.

References 

Sociology journals
Geography journals
Anthropology journals
Open access journals
Publications established in 2004
English-language journals
Demography journals